Nikolay Ivanovich Parfyonov (25 July 1912 – 7 January 1999) is a Soviet and Russian theater and film actor. Honored Art Worker of the RSFSR (1968).

Known for having played many roles, mostly in episodes.

Filmography 
 Son of the Regiment (1946) as Kuzma Gorbunov
 Adventures of Krosh (1961) as Vladimir Georgiyevich
 The First Trolleybus (1963) as chauffeur
 Give Me a Book of Complaints (1964) as Ivan Postnikov
 The Chairman (1964) as Klyagin
 Come Here, Mukhtar! (1964) as Gubarev
 Children of Don Quixote (1965) as Afanasy Petrovich
 Thirty Three (1965) as Prokhorov
 Seven Old Men and a Girl (1968) as Sukhov
 Afonya (1975) as Boris Petrovich
 Tears Were Falling (1982) as Kuzyakin
 Sincerely Yours... (1985) as Novikov
 Do Not Marry, Girls (1985) as Trofimov
 Where is the Nophelet? (1987) as Fyodor Golikov
 Private Detective, or Operation Cooperation (1989) as Mogilny
 Weather Is Good on Deribasovskaya, It Rains Again on Brighton Beach (1992) as Petrenko

References

External links 
 

20th-century Russian male actors
Male actors from Moscow
People from Vladimir Oblast
Russian male film actors
Russian male stage actors
1999 deaths
1912 births